Samuel Taylor was an American football and basketball coach.  He served as the head football coach at Hillsdale College in Hillsdale, Michigan in 1919, compiling a record of 3–4.  Taylor was also the head basketball coach at Hillsdale for one season, in 1919–20, tallying a mark of 10–4.

References

Year of death missing
Year of birth missing
Hillsdale Chargers football coaches
Hillsdale Chargers men's basketball coaches